Calospila is a butterfly genus in the family Riodinidae. They are resident in the Americas.

Species list 
 Calospila antonii Brévignon, 1995 French Guiana
 Calospila apotheta (Bates, 1868) French Guiana, Guyana, Suriname, Colombia, Brazil
 Calospila asteria (Stichel, 1911) Costa Rica, Colombia
 Calospila byzeres (Hewitson, 1872) Brazil
 Calospila candace (Druce, 1904) Brazil
 Calospila cerealis (Hewitson, [1863]) Brazil
 Calospila cilissa (Hewitson, [1863]) Nicaragua, Honduras, Colombia
 Calospila cuprea (Butler, 1867) Brazil
 Calospila emylius (Cramer, 1775) French Guiana, Guyana, Suriname, Trinidad and Tobago, Bolivia, Brazil, Peru
 Calospila fannia (Godman, 1903) Guyana
 Calospila gallardi Brévignon, 1995 French Guiana
 Calospila gyges (Stichel, 1911) French Guiana, Peru
 Calospila hemileuca (Bates, 1868) Panama, Costa Rica, Colombia, Ecuador, Brazil
 Calospila idmon (Godman & Salvin, 1889) Panama
 Calospila irene (Westwood, 1851) Brazil
 Calospila latona (Hewitson, 1853) Venezuela, Brazil
 Calospila lucetia (Hübner, 1821) Brazil
 Calospila lucianus (Fabricius, 1793) Venezuela, Costa Rica, Panama, Trinidad and Tobago, Suriname, Colombia
 Calospila maeon (Godman, 1903) Colombia
 Calospila maeonoides (Godman, 1903) Guyana
 Calospila martialis (C. & R. Felder, 1865) Suriname
 Calospila parthaon (Dalman, 1823) Brazil
 Calospila pelarge (Godman & Salvin, 1878) Mexico, Panama, Guatemala
 Calospila pirene (Godman, 1903) Peru
 Calospila rhesa (Hewitson, [1858]) Brazil
 Calospila rhodope (Hewitson, 1853) French Guiana, Guyana, Suriname, Trinidad and Tobago, Brazil, Ecuador, Peru
 Calospila satyroides (Lathy, 1932) Guyana
 Calospila siaka (Hewitson, [1858]) Brazil
 Calospila simplaris (Stichel, 1911) Brazil
 Calospila thara (Hewitson, [1858]) French Guiana, Guyana, Suriname, Brazil, Ecuador, Peru
 Calospila urichi (May, 1972) Trinidad and Tobago
 Calospila zeanger (Stoll, [1790]) French Guiana, Guyana, Suriname, Trinidad and Tobago

Sources 
 Calospila

External links
images representing Calospila at Encyclopedia of Life
images representing Calospila at Consortium for the Barcode of Life

Riodininae
Butterfly genera
Taxa named by Carl Geyer